Andrew Bruce Abel (born December 3, 1952) is an American economist, a professor in the Department of Finance in The Wharton School of the University of Pennsylvania.

Biography
Abel was born on December 3, 1952. He has been named the Ronald A. Rosenfeld Professor since July 1, 2003 and the Professor of the Department of Finance in The Wharton School of the University of Pennsylvania. He received a PhD at the Massachusetts Institute of Technology (M.I.T.) in 1978 and BA, at Princeton University in 1974.

Career
Abel is a research associate at the National Bureau of Economic Research, a member of the advisory committee at the Carnegie-Rochester Conference Series, the Panel of Economic Advisors and the Long-Term Modeling Group of the Congressional Budget Office, and a visiting scholar at the Federal Reserve Bank of Philadelphia. He was a former faculty for economics at the University of Chicago and Harvard University. He also has been a visiting faculty member for economics departments at the Hebrew University of Jerusalem and Tel Aviv University. He has written an intermediate-level macroeconomics textbook coauthored with Ben Bernanke (and also Dean Croushore in later editions).

Honors, fellowships and grants
Phi Beta Kappa (1974)
National Science Foundation Graduate Fellowship (1974–77)
Research Fellowship, Federal Reserve Bank of Boston (1977–78)
Grant from U.S. Department of Energy (1981–82)
Grants from National Science Foundation (1982–91, 1993–1996)
John Kenneth Galbraith Award for Excellence in Teaching (1984)
Sloan Research Fellowship (1986–1988)
Fellow of the Econometric Society (1991-)
MBA Core Curriculum Cluster Award (1996–1997)

Publications

Books
Investment and the Value of Capital, Garland Publishing, Inc., New York, New York (1979)
Federal Reserve Bank of Boston, Report 65 (December 1978)
The Collected Papers of Franco Modigliani (editor), M.I.T. Press, Cambridge, Massachusetts, Volumes I, II, and III (1980)
Macroeconomics, Addison-Wesley Publishing, Reading Massachusetts, with Ben S. Bernanke (1992); sixth edition with Dean Croushore
Macroeconomics translated into Italian; second edition (1995)
Macroeconomics translated into Japanese; third edition (1998), fourth edition (2001)
Macroeconomics translated into Greek; fifth edition (2005)
Macroeconomics translated into Chinese; sixth edition (2008)
Macroeconomics, Canadian Edition, Addison-Wesley Publishers Limited, Don Mills, Ontario, Canada, with Ben S. Bernanke and Gregor W. Smith, Ronald D. Kneebone, first edition (1995)
Macroeconomics, European Edition, Addison Wesley Longman Limited, Essex, England, with Ben S. Bernanke and Robert McNabb (1998)

References

External links 

1952 births
Living people
21st-century American economists
MIT School of Humanities, Arts, and Social Sciences alumni
Princeton University alumni
Wharton School of the University of Pennsylvania faculty
Fellows of the Econometric Society